Ankushrao Tope  was an Indian politician, elected to the Lok Sabha, the lower house of the Parliament of India as a member of the Indian National Congress.

References

External links
Official biographical sketch in Parliament of India website

India MPs 1991–1996
Lok Sabha members from Maharashtra
1942 births
2016 deaths